Division No. 22, also informally known as Thompson-North Central, is a census division within the Province of Manitoba, Canada. Unlike in some other provinces, census divisions do not reflect the organization of local government in Manitoba. These areas exist solely for the purposes of statistical analysis and presentation; they have no government of their own.

The division had a population of 38,421 in the Canada 2006 Census. The economic base of the area is mining, forestry, manufacturing, commercial fishing, trapping and tourism.

Demographics 

Communities

Cities
 Thompson

Local government districts
 Mystery Lake

First Nations communities
 Cross Lake (19, 19A, 19B, 19C, 19E)
 Garden Hill
 Gods Lake Narrows 23
 Ilford
 Gods River 86A
 Nelson House 170
 Norway House 17
 Oxford House 24
 Red Sucker Lake 1976
 St. Theresa Point
 Split Lake 171 (part)
 Wasagamack
 York Factory

Unorganized areas
 Unorganized Division No. 22

References

External links
 Thompson-North Central Census Map
 Map of Division No. 22, Manitoba at Statcan

22
Northern Region, Manitoba